XHENZ-FM is a radio station on 92.9 FM in Culiacán, Sinaloa, Mexico. It carries the Los 40 pop format.

History
XENZ-AM 570 received its concession on April 10, 1958. It was owned by Radio Impulsora de Culiacán, S.A., broadcasting with 1,000 watts day and 250 night. It was acquired by the current concessionaire in 1984. The 1990s saw XENZ move to 890 kHz with 10,000 watts during the day.

XENZ migrated to FM in 2010 as XHENZ-FM 92.9. In December 2016, XHENZ and sister station XHWS-FM 102.5 were separated from Radiorama and flipped to MegaRadio formats, marking MegaRadio's second expansion in Sinaloa in just months after it had previously entered Mazatlán. As a result, XHWS changed from La Sinaloense to Magia Digital. XHENZ then broke from XHWS and became  Los 40 Culiacán in 2017.

References

Radio stations in Sinaloa
Radio stations established in 1958